Franciszek Armiński (born October 2, 1789 in Tymbark – January 14, 1848 in Warsaw) was a Polish astronomer.

He was professor at the Warsaw University and director of the astronomical observatory in Łazienki Park, Warsaw. He studied many astronomical acts and predicted space theories.

1789 births
1848 deaths
People from Limanowa County
People from the Kingdom of Galicia and Lodomeria
19th-century Polish astronomers
Academic staff of the University of Warsaw